196 A.D. is a year.

196 may also refer to:
 196 BC
 196 (number)
 Florida State Road 196
 Alabama State Route 196
 Pennsylvania Route 196
 Georgia State Route 196
 Maine State Route 196
 New York State Route 196
 Ohio State Route 196
 Utah State Route 196
 Malaysia Federal Route 196
 Japan National Route 196
 Iowa Highway 196
 Wyoming Highway 196
 State Highway 196 (Maharashtra)
 Colorado State Highway 196
 Mexican Federal Highway 196
 K-196 (Kansas highway)
 Interstate 196
 JWH-196
 Jordan 196
 Kosmos 196
 Lectionary 196
 TR-196
 USA-196
 USS Searaven (SS-196)
 USS Rinehart (DE-196)
 USS Logan (APA-196)
 USS George E. Badger (DD-196)
 USS Mahopac (ATA-196)
 USS Minidoka (AK-196)
 German submarine U-196
 No. 196 Squadron RAF
 196th Infantry Brigade (United States)
 196th Infantry Division (Wehrmacht)
 196th Ohio Infantry
 196th Battalion (Western Universities), CEF
 196th Infantry Regiment (United States)
 196th Division (People's Republic of China)